Agnes Tachyon (Japanese : アグネスタキオン, April 13, 1998 - June 22, 2009) was an undefeated Japanese Thoroughbred racehorse and a Leading sire in Japan.

He was by Sunday Silence, his dam, Agnes Flora (by Royal Ski) won the Oka Sho (Japanese 1000 Guineas) and his granddam Agnes Lady won the Yushun Himba (Japanese Oaks). Agnes Flora also produced the Tokyo Yushun (Japanese Derby) winner Agnes Flight.

Racing record
Agnes Tachyon was undefeated in his four race starts, including Satsuki Sho (Japanese 2000 Guineas), before a bowed tendon ended his racing career. He later became a successful sire in Japan.

 Major race wins
 2001 Satsuki Sho (Japanese 2000 Guineas) (Domestic GI) 
 2001 Yayoi Sho (Domestic GII) 
 2000 Radio Tampa Hai Sansai Stakes (Domestic GIII)

Stud record
Agnes Tachyon's descendants include:

c = colt, f = filly

Agnes Tachyon was the Leading sire in Japan in 2008 and died in June 2009, due to heart failure.

Pedigree

See also
 List of leading Thoroughbred racehorses

References

1998 racehorse births
2009 racehorse deaths
Racehorses bred in Japan
Racehorses trained in Japan
Undefeated racehorses
Thoroughbred family 1-l